Estil (also Romanized as Estīl; also known as Darreh Estīl and Darreh-ye Estīl) is a village in Qaleh Tall Rural District, in the Central District of Bagh-e Malek County, Khuzestan Province, Iran. At the 2006 census, its population was 120, in 23 families.

References 

Populated places in Bagh-e Malek County